The New Hampshire State Hospital was originally constructed in 1842 in Concord, New Hampshire, as the seventeenth such mental institution in the country to cater to the state's mentally ill population.

History 

It began simply with the main administration building with two symmetrical wings: the female ward to the left and the male ward to the right. In 1892, Dr. Charles Bancroft had the Bancroft Building constructed as a residential dormitory for female patients. The mansion used European-style architecture to create a more homelike feel for patients. The Twitchell House was built two years later in 1894 for the same reason but for male patients.

In 1899, a nurses' annex was built to accommodate the facilities' growing number of staff members. Before 1899, the nurses lived on patient wards during their shift intervals. This new nurses' home was connected to the Bancroft Building and the Main Administration Building via tunnel-esque hallways that allowed for easy travel.

In 1907, a new medical surgical building named the Thayer Building was constructed adjacent to the Main Administration Building. It provided the space for routine surgeries as well as sterilizations, which were commonplace during New Hampshire's eugenics movement.

More institutional buildings like the Walker Building (built between 1913 and 1917), the Brown Building (1924), and the Tobey Building (1930) provided compact housing as the hospital population spiked dramatically. The Brown Building was built to house female patients, while Tobey was constructed to house male patients. Brown continued to house patients until 1989, when they were transferred to the newly built facility on the same property, New Hampshire Hospital.

1941 brought about the construction of a new geriatric facility, the Dolloff Building, named for Dr. Charles Dolloff. The Thayer Building was converted into geriatric housing in the 1950s when the population of elderly increased. In 1960, the Philbrook Center was brought to fruition in the name of Dr. Anna L. Philbrook. Philbrook pioneered adolescent psychiatry and championed the addition of a separate facility for the care of mentally disturbed youths.

Modern use 
The facility closed its doors in 1989 and all services were moved to the new, state-of-the-art hospital, named the New Hampshire Hospital. The former buildings became state offices, with a large number of organizations operating out of the former hospital campus. The Bancroft Building, however, remains abandoned, as well as the Kent Annex and Peaslee Annex wings of the Main Administration Building.

Notable people
 Catherine Fiske (1764-1837), benefactor

References 

Hospitals in Concord, New Hampshire
Government buildings in New Hampshire
Defunct hospitals in New Hampshire
Psychiatric hospitals in New Hampshire
Hospitals disestablished in 1989